Totskoye (also Totskoe) is an air base in Russia located four kilometres southeast of Totskoye.  It is a standard military air base with small number of revetments in separate area.  There were 56 stored helicopters and five operational helicopters according to Google Earth high-resolution imagery made in 2003. Google Earth images from 29-08-2012 however shows an abandoned airfield.

The base was home to:
 281 IIAP (281st Instructor Interceptor Aviation Regiment) with 66 MiG-23 aircraft in 1991-94 
 833 IAP (833rd Interceptor Aviation Regiment) flying MiG-23 aircraft as of 1992).

Totskoye now hosts:
 2881 BRV (2881st Reserve Helicopter Base) storing Mi-8 and Mi-24 helicopters.

References

Soviet Air Force bases
Soviet Air Defence Force bases
Russian Air Force bases